Ceuthobotys is a genus of moths of the family Crambidae. It contains only one species, Ceuthobotys penai, which is found in Peru.

References

Pyraustinae
Taxa named by Eugene G. Munroe
Crambidae genera
Monotypic moth genera